A carbon sink is anything, natural or otherwise, that accumulates and stores some carbon-containing chemical compound for an indefinite period and thereby removes carbon dioxide from the atmosphere.  These sinks form an important part of the natural carbon cycle.

Globally, the two most important carbon sinks are vegetation and the ocean. Soil is an important carbon storage medium. Much of the organic carbon retained in the soil of agricultural areas has been depleted due to intensive farming. "Blue carbon" designates carbon that is fixed via the ocean ecosystems. Mangroves, salt marshes and seagrasses make up a majority of ocean plant life and store large quantities of carbon.

Many efforts are being made to enhance natural carbon sinks to, mainly soils and forests to mitigate climate change. These efforts counter historical trends caused by practices like deforestation and industrial agriculture which depleted natural carbon sinks; land use, land-use change, and forestry historically have been important human contributions to climate change. In addition to enhancing natural processes, investments in artificial sequestration initiatives are underway to store carbon in building materials or deep underground.

Definition 
In the context of climate change and in particular mitigation, a sink is defined as "Any process, activity or mechanism which removes a greenhouse gas, an aerosol or a precursor of a greenhouse gas from the atmosphere". 

Related terms are "carbon pool, reservoir, sequestration, source and uptake". The same publication defines carbon pool as "a  reservoir in the Earth system where elements, such as carbon [...], reside in various chemical forms for a period of time."

Types
The amount of carbon dioxide varies naturally in a dynamic equilibrium with photosynthesis of land plants. The natural carbon sinks are:
Soil is a carbon store and active carbon sink.
 Photosynthesis by terrestrial plants with grass and trees allows them to serve as carbon sinks during growing seasons.
 Absorption of carbon dioxide by the oceans via solubility and biological pumps.

Artificial carbon sinks are those that store carbon in building materials or deep underground (geologic carbon sequestration). No major artificial systems remove carbon from the atmosphere on a large scale yet.

Public awareness of the significance of  sinks has grown since passage of the 1997 Kyoto Protocol, which promotes their use as a form of carbon offset.

Natural carbon sinks

Soils 
Soils represent a short to long-term carbon storage medium, and contain more carbon than all terrestrial vegetation and the atmosphere combined. Plant litter and other biomass including charcoal accumulates as organic matter in soils, and is degraded by chemical weathering and biological degradation. More recalcitrant organic carbon polymers such as cellulose, hemi-cellulose, lignin, aliphatic compounds, waxes and terpenoids are collectively retained as humus. 

Organic matter tends to accumulate in litter and soils of colder regions such as the boreal forests of North America and the Taiga of Russia. Leaf litter and humus are rapidly oxidized and poorly retained in sub-tropical and tropical climate conditions due to high temperatures and extensive leaching by rainfall. Areas where shifting cultivation or slash and burn agriculture are practiced are generally only fertile for two to three years before they are abandoned.  These tropical jungles are similar to coral reefs in that they are highly efficient at conserving and circulating necessary nutrients, which explains their lushness in a nutrient desert. 

Grasslands contribute to soil organic matter, stored mainly in their extensive fibrous root mats. Due in part to the climatic conditions of these regions (e.g. cooler temperatures and semi-arid to arid conditions), these soils can accumulate significant quantities of organic matter. This can vary based on rainfall, the length of the winter season, and the frequency of naturally occurring lightning-induced grass-fires. While these fires release carbon dioxide, they improve the quality of the grasslands overall, in turn increasing the amount of carbon retained in the humic material. They also deposit carbon directly to the soil in the form of biochar that does not significantly degrade back to carbon dioxide.

Organic matter in peat bogs undergoes slow anaerobic decomposition below the surface. This process is slow enough that in many cases the bog grows rapidly and fixes more carbon from the atmosphere than is released.  Over time, the peat grows deeper. Peat bogs hold approximately one-quarter of the carbon stored in land plants and soils.

Enhancing soil carbon sinks 

Much organic carbon retained in many agricultural areas worldwide has been severely depleted due to intensive farming practices. Since the 1850s, a large proportion of the world's grasslands have been tilled and converted to croplands, allowing the rapid oxidation of large quantities of soil organic carbon. Methods that significantly enhance carbon sequestration in soil include no-till farming, residue mulching, cover cropping, and crop rotation, all of which are more widely used in organic farming than in conventional farming.

Forests 

Forests are generally carbon dioxide sinks when they are increasing in density or area. However, they can also be carbon sources.

FAO reported that: "The total carbon stock in forests decreased from 668 gigatonnes in 1990 to 662 gigatonnes in 2020". However, another study finds that the leaf area index has increased globally since 1981, which was responsible for 12.4% of the accumulated terrestrial carbon sink from 1981 to 2016. The CO2 fertilization effect, on the other hand, was responsible for 47% of the sink, while climate change reduced the sink by 28.6%. In Canada's boreal forests as much as 80% of the total carbon is stored in the soils as dead organic matter.

Truly mature tropical forests, by definition, grow rapidly, with each tree producing at least 10 new trees each year. Based on studies by FAO and UNEP, it has been estimated that Asian forests absorb about 5 tonnes of carbon dioxide per hectare each year. 

In 2019 forests took up a third less carbon than they did in the 1990s, due to higher temperatures, droughts and deforestation. The typical tropical forest may become a carbon source by the 2060s. One study in 2020 found that 32 tracked Brazilian non-Amazon seasonal tropical forests declined from a carbon sink to a carbon source in 2013 and concludes that "policies are needed to mitigate the emission of greenhouse gases and to restore and protect tropical seasonal forests". 

Carbon offset programs are planting millions of fast-growing trees per year to reforest tropical lands, for as little as $0.10 per tree; over their typical 40-year lifetime, one million of these trees will fix 1 a million tons of carbon dioxide.

Life expectancy of forests varies throughout the world, influenced by tree species, site conditions and natural disturbance patterns. In some forests, carbon may be stored for centuries, while in other forests, carbon is released with frequent stand replacing fires. Forests that are harvested prior to stand replacing events allow for the retention of carbon in manufactured forest products such as lumber. However, only a portion of the carbon removed from logged forests ends up as durable goods and buildings. The remainder ends up as sawmill by-products such as pulp, paper and pallets, which often end with incineration (resulting in carbon release into the atmosphere) at the end of their lifecycle. For instance, of the 1,692 megatonnes of carbon harvested from forests in Oregon and Washington from 1900 to 1992, only 23% is in long-term storage in forest products.

Changes in albedo effect

Tidal marshes, mangroves and seagrasses

Enhancing natural carbon sinks

Purpose in the context of climate change

Carbon sequestration techniques in oceans 

To enhance carbon sequestration processes in oceans the following technologies have been proposed but none have achieved large scale application so far: Seaweed farming, ocean fertilisation, artificial upwelling, basalt storage, mineralization and deep sea sediments, adding bases to neutralize acids. The idea of direct deep-sea carbon dioxide injection has been abandoned.

Movements between different carbon sinks

Riverine transport

Terrestrial and marine ecosystems are chiefly connected through riverine transport, which acts as the main channel through which erosive terrestrially derived substances enter into oceanic systems. Material and energy exchanges between the terrestrial biosphere and the lithosphere as well as organic carbon fixation and oxidation processes together regulate ecosystem carbon and dioxygen (O2) pools.

Riverine transport, being the main connective channel of these pools, will act to transport net primary productivity (primarily in the form of dissolved organic carbon (DOC) and particulate organic carbon (POC)) from terrestrial to oceanic systems. During transport, part of DOC will rapidly return to the atmosphere through redox reactions, causing "carbon degassing" to occur between land-atmosphere storage layers. The remaining DOC and dissolved inorganic carbon (DIC) are also exported to the ocean. In 2015, inorganic and organic carbon export fluxes from global rivers were assessed as 0.50–0.70 Pg C y−1 and 0.15–0.35 Pg C y−1 respectively. On the other hand, POC can remain buried in sediment over an extensive period, and the annual global terrestrial to oceanic POC flux has been estimated at 0.20 (+0.13,-0.07) Gg C y−1.

Artificial carbon sinks

Geologic carbon sequestration

Wooden buildings 

Broad-base adoption of mass timber and their role in substituting steel and concrete in new mid-rise construction projects over the next few decades has the potential to turn timber buildings into carbon sinks, as they store the carbon dioxide taken up from the air by trees that are harvested and used as mass timber.  This could result in storing between 10 million tons of carbon per year in the lowest scenario and close to 700 million tons in the highest scenario. For this to happen, the harvested forests would need to be sustainably managed and wood from demolished timber buildings would need to be reused or preserved on land in various forms.

See also 

 Climate-smart agriculture

References 

Carbon dioxide
Carbon dioxide removal
Photosynthesis
Gas technologies